John Keiran Barry Moylan Nicholas (1919–2002) was a British legal scholar. He was Professor of Comparative Law at the University of Oxford from 1971 to 1978, and Principal of Brasenose College, Oxford, from 1978 to 1989.

Early life
Nicholas was born on 6 July 1919 to Archibald John Nicholas and Rose (née Moylan). He was educated at Downside School, a Catholic private school in Somerset, England. He then matriculated into Brasenose College, Oxford, where he was a scholar and studied classics: he achieved first class honours in Mods in 1939. Having taken a break from university to serve in the war, he returned to his college to study Jurisprudence: he graduated with a first class Bachelor of Arts (BA) degree in 1946.

Academic career
He began teaching at Brasenose College, Oxford, in 1946, and served as Principal of the college from 1978 to 1989. He gave up the position at the appointed age of 70, but he did not retire. He additionally served as All Souls Reader in Roman Law from 1949 to 1971, and Professor of Comparative Law at the University of Oxford from 1971 to 1978.

Nicholas' An Introduction to Roman Law is a standard text in the study of Roman law.

There is an obituary notice  by Peter Birks for the British Academy.

References

1919 births
2002 deaths
Fellows of Brasenose College, Oxford
Principals of Brasenose College, Oxford
Linklaters Professors of Comparative Law
People educated at Downside School
Alumni of Brasenose College, Oxford